Schelte John "Bobby" Bus (born 1956) is an American astronomer and discoverer of minor planets at the Institute for Astronomy of the University of Hawaii and deputy director of NASA's Infrared Telescope Facility (IRTF) at the Mauna Kea Observatory in Hawaii, United States.

Biography 

Bus graduated in 1979 from Caltech with a BS. In 1999, he received his Ph.D. from the Massachusetts Institute of Technology. With MIT's Richard Binzel, Bus further added to the knowledge about main-belt asteroids in a spectroscopic survey published in 2002. This project was known as Small Main-Belt Asteroid Spectroscopic Survey, Phase II or SMASSII, which built on a previous survey of the main-belt asteroids. The visible-wavelength (435–925 nanometers) spectra data was gathered between August 1993 and March 1999. During his studies, he worked under the supervision of Eugene Shoemaker. As of 2017, Bus is an Astronomer at the University of Hawaii Institute for Astronomy and deputy director of NASA's Infrared Telescope Facility IRTF.

Awards and honors 

Asteroid 3254 Bus, which was discovered in 1982 by Edward Bowell, was named in his honor.

Discoveries 

In 1981, Bus discovered periodic comet 87P/Bus. Since 1975, he has also discovered or co-discovered over a thousand asteroids, including: an Apollo asteroid, 2135 Aristaeus, which will come within 13 lunar distances of the Earth on 30 March 2147; an Amor asteroid; and more than 40 Jupiter trojans. The first of these was 3240 Laocoon, which he co-discovered with Eleanor F. Helin. Bus was also the discoverer of asteroids 5020 Asimov and 4923 Clarke, named after two science fiction writers (see  and ).

See also

References

External links 
 Bus' Personal Home Page

1956 births
Living people
20th-century American astronomers
21st-century American astronomers
Discoverers of asteroids
Massachusetts Institute of Technology alumni
People from Hawaii (island)